Leslie Smith (2 October 1920 – 2001) was a professional footballer, who played for Huddersfield Town and Oldham Athletic.

Smith began his career as an amateur at Stockport County, but left the club without making an appearance for the club. In March 1946, he joined Huddersfield Town, where he spent three years before moving to Oldham Athletic where he spent seven seasons, playing close to 200 first-team games.

He died in 2001.

References

1920 births
2001 deaths
English footballers
Footballers from Manchester
Association football wing halves
English Football League players
Huddersfield Town A.F.C. players
Oldham Athletic A.F.C. players
Stockport County F.C. players
Date of death missing